The Registry of World Record Size Shells is a conchological work listing the largest (and in some cases smallest) verified shell specimens of various marine molluscan taxa. A successor to the earlier World Size Records of Robert J. L. Wagner and R. Tucker Abbott, it has been published on a semi-regular basis since 1997, changing ownership and publisher a number of times. Originally planned for release every two years, new editions are now published annually. Since 2008 the entire registry has been available online in the form of a searchable database. The registry is continuously expanded and now contains more than 24,000 listings and 85,000 supporting images.

Certain families of attractive shells (such as cones, cowries, marginellas, and murex) are particularly favoured by collectors. World record size shells (commonly indicated by the acronym 'WRS') of species in the most popular families are much sought after by some shell collectors, and can thus command high prices. Collections of such shells are exhibited at a number of specialist museums, including the Bailey-Matthews National Shell Museum. Maximum and minimum sizes are also of interest to malacologists, and may be useful in delimiting closely related species. As an extensive compilation of maximum shell sizes, the registry has found use as a data source for scientific studies.

Overview

Scope
Throughout its history the registry has covered four classes of molluscs: bivalves, cephalopods, gastropods, and scaphopods. Chitons have been excluded because their shells are formed from eight articulated plates and therefore the size of a fixed specimen depends in large part on the preservation method used.

Smallest adult sizes have been listed beginning with a few specimens of Cypraeidae and Strombidae in the first edition, and they now additionally encompass a third family: Marginellidae. Separate records for sinistral (left-handed) shells and obviously rostrate cowries (family Cypraeidae) are also included. Terrestrial and freshwater species, as well as fossils (of extant taxa or otherwise), are not covered by the registry.

Content

The bulk of the publication—which apart from the cover is unillustrated—comprises a list of taxa and their corresponding world record sizes. Each specimen in the registry is listed alphabetically under its recognised scientific name. This is usually a binomen (species name), but subspecies, varieties and forms are also included (the latter two are used informally and are not regulated by the ICZN). In addition to the shell size, each specimen is listed with its location, owner or repository, and the year it was collected, acquired, or registered (whichever is known, listed in decreasing order of preference).

Each print edition has an appendix with an alphabetical listing of entry totals for all private collectors and repositories having ownership of specimens in the registry. In the first edition, the most individual entries belonged to Victor Dan, with 369, closely followed by co-author Don Pisor on 325. This title subsequently went to Tennessee physician and world-renowned collector Pete Stimpson, who for a time held over 2,000 entries in the registry, and whose WRS specimens have been exhibited at museums including the McClung Museum of Natural History and Culture. As of the fifth print edition from 2008, the distinction of having the most WRS entries belonged to Havelet Marine, with 3,244 specimens, compared to Stimpson's 1,963.

Measurements
The registry's rules specify that specimens "should be measured with vernier type calipers and should reflect the greatest measurable dimension of the shell in any direction including any processes of hard shell material produced by the animal (i.e. spines, wings, keels, siphonal canals, etc.) and not including attachments, barnacles, coralline algae, or any other encrusting organisms. Long, hair-like periostracum is not to be included." This "greatest measurable dimension" can be at odds with the standard scientific definition of shell length (from base to apex along the central axis for gastropods, and from the umbo to the ventral margin in bivalves).

Shell sizes are given in millimetres and recorded to the nearest , as is standard in conchology. To account for human error and environmental effects, new records are only accepted if they exceed the standing record by at least . This 0.3 mm margin also applies to smallest adult sizes exceeding .

Entries for specimens that tie the standing record can also be submitted. Though not included in the registry, they are kept on file for future use in the event that the current record holder is shown to be misidentified or smaller than originally claimed.

Superlative species

The extinct gastropod Campanile giganteum reached a similar or slightly greater size, while the largest extinct bivalves and especially the largest extinct shelled cephalopods were much larger still (and the internal shells of the largest extant squid species also reach much greater lengths, as they approximate the mantle length). However, only external shells (with some exceptions, e.g. Spirula spirula) of extant species are covered by the registry.

But the smallest end-stage "shells" of all, broadly defined, are likely to be vestigial internal gastropod shells, which could be almost arbitrarily small, perhaps consisting of only a few molecules.

Size verification
For inclusion in the registry, size records must be verified either by a recognised second party ("a professional malacologist, a reputable shell dealer, or an advanced collector who is recognized as a specialist in the applicable family") or through photographic evidence (three images, showing the shell being measured with calipers and its dorsal and ventral aspects). Entries may be submitted by regular mail or e-mail; a submission form is included at the back of each print edition. These requirements mean that in some cases older or even current malacological literature may include size records which exceed those found in the registry.

In the early years of the registry, shells were sometimes officially measured for world record size status at Conchologists of America conventions, as in 1999 when the measurements were carried out by senior author Kim Hutsell.

History

Background
Beginning in the mid–20th century, several attempts were made to produce a list of the largest shell specimens. Perhaps the earliest of these was the Lost Operculum Club List of Champions, initiated in 1950 by John Q. Burch (1894–1974) of the Los Angeles–based Conchological Club of Southern California. This project was overseen by Bertram C. Draper (1904–2000) between 1966 and 1987, and bore four major print publications during this time. The list was limited in scope compared to later efforts, encompassing only marine species of the Eastern Pacific, from Alaska to Chile. Unlike later publications it notably included a small number of fossil specimens.

The direct predecessor to the Registry of World Record Size Shells was World Size Records, compiled by renowned malacologists Robert J. L. Wagner (1905–1992) and R. Tucker Abbott (1919–1995). These record sizes originally appeared in 1964, in the first edition of Van Nostrand's Standard Catalog of Shells, not as a separate list but interspersed among other species-specific information that made up the bulk of the work. An updated list—now with a section unto itself and running to eight pages—was published as part of the book's second edition, in 1967. Though not stated as such, records from 1950–1959 were taken from lists in the "Minutes of the Conchological Club of Southern California" and included outdated information, including long-deceased owners.  The next update appeared in the work's third edition, which was renamed Wagner and Abbott's Standard Catalog of Shells. Unlike previous editions, this third and final installment of the catalog was a ring binder with loose-leaf content, intended as a continually updated resource. To match the newly retitled work, the list's name was modified to Wagner and Abbott's World Size Records. In this final incarnation, the list appeared as a series of four supplements: the first two were loose-leaf publications that appeared in 1978 and 1982, and these were followed by hole-punched paperback titles in 1985 and 1990. The records were to be maintained "by a special committee of editors through which accurate measurements and correct identifications are verified by knowledgeable conchologists". The third supplement encompassed shells from 21 museums and more than 300 private collections, with the authors of the opinion that "many new records lurk in museums where scientists do not have the time or inclination to measure largest specimens". At the time, the American Museum of Natural History officially held the most record specimens, followed by the British Museum (Natural History) (London's Natural History Museum) and the Natural History Museum of Los Angeles County. The much-expanded fourth supplement incorporated many records from the final (1987) edition of the Lost Operculum Club List of Champions. It also lowered the minimum shell size to one inch (2.54 cm) from the previous 4.00 cm (except for Cypraea, which did not have a lower limit). Carole Hertz, long-time editor of The Festivus, noted that "a few" records were outdated upon publication as they listed deceased shell owners. Wagner died in 1992 and, though it was announced the following year that World Size Records would continue to be published, no further supplements were completed before Abbott's death in 1995.

Registry of World Record Size Shells
Following the deaths of Wagner and Abbott, Barbara Haviland continued to compile data for world records. In 1997 Kim C. Hutsell acquired the rights from Cynthia Abbott to World Size Records to continue the project as a stand-alone book; those rights were subsequently sold to Don L. Pisor. The first edition therefore incorporated many of the earlier entries, as well as additional data compiled for World Size Records by Haviland. The format of the new publication differed from World Size Records in several important ways. In another change, the registry listed taxa alphabetically by species name within families, instead of within genera as they had been previously. This system allows for easy comparison between closely related genera, is more resilient to the frequent taxonomic changes that occur at the genus level, and gets around the issue that many shell dealers prefer to lump numerous genera for the sake of simplicity. R. Tucker Abbott had himself intended to use this arrangement in the fifth edition of his World Size Records, but died before he could see his plans through. Another difference was the presentation of sizes in millimetres to the nearest tenth instead of centimetres to the nearest hundredth, moving the publication in line with standard usage in conchology. Finally, references were added for each specimen to aid in identification. The opening paragraph of the first edition set out the project's goals and invited submissions:

While the importance of maximum shell size and its role in the overall scheme of Conchology and Malacology is debatable, it remains one point of continual interest among collectors and researchers. The purpose of the Registry of World Record Size Shells is to provide a single publication containing a list of the largest known specimens for as many shelled molluscan species as possible in a format designed for ease of use. Undoubtedly, specimens may exist, hidden in museums, universities and private collections, which exceed some of the sizes listed herein. It is the sincere hope of the editors that information concerning such specimens be shared with others by submitting accurate and verifiable records to the Registry of World Record Size Shells.

The largest shell specimens are often housed in museums, but such institutions can rarely commit significant resources towards mensuration, and most records pertaining to museum specimens were collated by volunteers.

Kim C. Hutsell, Linda L. Hutsell and Don L. Pisor released the first three editions in 1997, 1999, and 2001. These were published by the Hutsells' company, Snail's Pace Productions, and distributed by Pisor's Marine Shells, both based in San Diego, California. The first edition went on sale at the 1997 Conchologists of America (COA) convention in Captiva Island, Florida. Originally called Hutsell & Pisor's Registry of World Record Size Shells, for the third edition the title was modified slightly to Hutsell, Hutsell and Pisor's Registry of World Record Size Shells (as given on the respective title pages).

The text of the fourth edition was completed by Kim and Linda Hutsell and originally planned for release at the 2003 COA convention in Tacoma, Washington, but was greatly delayed and only came out in 2005. The fifth edition appeared three years later. With the departure of the first two authors, the titles of the fourth and fifth editions were shortened to Pisor's Registry of World Record Size Shells (as given on the title pages). These also marked a switch from Snail's Pace Productions to a new main publisher, ConchBooks of Hackenheim, Germany. They were compiled with the help of Conchology, Inc., with the company's founder, Guido T. Poppe, providing an introduction for the fifth edition.

On 2 April 2008, the copyrights to the registry were transferred from Pisor to Jean-Pierre Barbier of Topseashells and Philippe Quiquandon of Shell's Passion. With Olivier Santini, Barbier and Quiquandon subsequently launched an official website where all registry listings can be accessed for a fee. The online database includes photographs of the listed specimens that have been gathered with the help of collectors, dealers, and institutions such as the Muséum national d'Histoire naturelle in Paris. Older records for which photographic evidence could not be obtained were removed from the database and replaced by verified specimens, even if these were smaller, to ensure that all specimens were measured and identified correctly. Barbier, Quiquandon and Santini moved the print title to an annual publication cycle, starting with the sixth edition in 2009, with Shell's Passion and Topseashells taking over as publishers. Under the new ownership the print edition was titled simply Registry of World Record Size Shells. The number of listings increased rapidly during the first few years, from just over 12,200 in 2009 to more than 17,000 in 2011. It was announced that the fifteenth print edition (2018) would be the last single-volume work, owing to the publication's increasingly unwieldy size; the first two-volume edition appeared the following year, spanning around 750 pages.

List of publications

The Lost Operculum Club List of Champions appeared in four main editions and at least one supplement between 1969 and 1987. Prior to this the list had appeared in abbreviated form in publications such as The Echo.

 First edition (May 1969). B.C. Draper. Conchological Club of Southern California. 44 pp.
 Second edition (April 1973). B.C. Draper. Conchological Club of Southern California. 64 pp. 
 Supplement (1975). B.C. Draper. Conchological Club of Southern California. 13 pp.
 Third edition (May 1980). B.C. Draper. Conchological Club of Southern California. 32 pp. 
 Fourth edition (June 1987). B.C. Draper. Conchological Club of Southern California. 43 pp. 

World Size Records originally appeared in the first and second editions of the Standard Catalog of Shells in 1964 and 1967, and then as four supplements to the third edition (one of which was titled a revision) between 1978 and 1990. A list of new entries—submitted for inclusion in World Size Records as of November 1987—appeared across the 1988 and 1989 issues of Hawaiian Shell News and also in American Conchologist.

 First edition (December 1964). [part of Van Nostrand's Standard Catalog of Shells, 1st edition; R.J.L. Wagner & R.T. Abbott (eds.). Van Nostrand. ix + 190 pp. .]
 Second edition (September 1967). [part of Van Nostrand's Standard Catalog of Shells, 2nd edition; R.J.L. Wagner & R.T. Abbott (eds.). Van Nostrand. 303 pp. .]
 Supplement 1 (September 1978). [part of Wagner and Abbott's Standard Catalog of Shells, 3rd edition with supplements (February 1978 onwards); R.J.L. Wagner & R.T. Abbott. American Malacologists. 700+ pp. . .]
 Revision 1 (October 1982). R.J.L. Wagner & R.T. Abbott. American Malacologists. 25 pp.
 Supplement 3 (January 1985). R.J.L. Wagner & R.T. Abbott. American Malacologists. 30 pp. ~1,200 listings. [content actually dated February 1985]
 Supplement 4 (September 1990). R.J.L. Wagner & R.T. Abbott. American Malacologists. ii + 80 pp. . 2,318 listings. [content actually dated 27 April 1990]

The Registry of World Record Size Shells has appeared in seventeen print editions since 1997. From the fifth (2008) edition onwards, new editions have been released on an annual basis. All editions are of the approximate dimensions  and have coil or comb binding, with heavy paper covers and a clear plastic sheet protecting the front cover.

 First edition (June 1997). K.C. Hutsell, L.L. Hutsell & D.L. Pisor. Snail's Pace Productions. ii + 101 pp. . . 4,470+ listings.
 Second edition (June 1999). K.C. Hutsell, L.L. Hutsell & D.L. Pisor. Snail's Pace Productions. vii + 131 pp. . . 6,100+ listings.
 Third edition (June 2001). K.C. Hutsell, L.L. Hutsell & D.L. Pisor. Snail's Pace Productions. vii + 158 pp. . . 7,100+ listings.
 Fourth edition (March 2005). D.L. Pisor. ConchBooks. 171 pp. . . 9,500+ listings.
 Fifth edition (March 2008). D.L. Pisor (introduction by G.T. Poppe). ConchBooks. 207 pp. . . 11,500+ listings.
 Sixth edition (2009). J.-P. Barbier, P. Quiquandon & O. Santini. Shell's Passion & Topseashells. 304 pp. . . 12,200+ listings.
 Seventh edition (2010). J.-P. Barbier, P. Quiquandon & O. Santini. Shell's Passion & Topseashells.
 Eighth edition (2011). J.-P. Barbier, P. Quiquandon & O. Santini. Shell's Passion & Topseashells. Unpaginated. . 17,000+ listings.
 Ninth edition (2012). J.-P. Barbier, P. Quiquandon & O. Santini. Shell's Passion & Topseashells. Unpaginated. 17,300+ listings.
 Tenth edition (2013). J.-P. Barbier, P. Quiquandon & O. Santini. Shell's Passion & Topseashells. Unpaginated. . 18,000+ listings.
 Eleventh edition (2014). J.-P. Barbier, P. Quiquandon & O. Santini. Shell's Passion & Topseashells. Unpaginated. . 18,400+ listings.
 Twelfth edition (2015). P. Quiquandon, J.-P. Barbier & A. Brunella. Shell's Passion & Topseashells. Unpaginated. . 19,600+ listings.
 Thirteenth edition (2016). P. Quiquandon, J.-P. Barbier & A. Brunella. Shell's Passion & Topseashells. Unpaginated. . 20,800+ listings.
 Fourteenth edition (2017). P. Quiquandon, J.-P. Barbier & A. Brunella. Shell's Passion & Topseashells. Unpaginated. . 21,560+ listings.
 Fifteenth edition (2018). P. Quiquandon, J.-P. Barbier & A. Brunella. Shell's Passion & Topseashells. Unpaginated. . 22,600+ listings.
 Sixteenth edition [2 volumes] (2019). Tome 1: Abyssochrysidae–Modulidae; Tome 2: Montacutidae–Yoldiidae. P. Quiquandon, J.-P. Barbier & A. Brunella. Shell's Passion & Topseashells. 749 pp. 23,500+ listings.
 Seventeenth edition [2 volumes] (2020). Tome 1: Abyssochrysidae–Modulidae; Tome 2: Montacutidae–Yoldiidae. P. Quiquandon, J.-P. Barbier & A. Brunella. Shell's Passion & Topseashells.  700 pp. 24,200+ listings.

Reviews

First edition

The first edition of the Registry of World Record Size Shells was reviewed for American Conchologist by malacologist Gary Rosenberg of the Academy of Natural Sciences of Philadelphia and conchologist Gene Everson.

Rosenberg spoke favourably of the changes made since World Size Records, namely the lowering of the minimum size for inclusion, listing sizes in millimetres, ordering species alphabetically within families irrespective of genus, and adding a reference field for identification purposes. He also welcomed the inclusion of separate entries for infraspecific taxa such as subspecies, varieties, and forms, noting that these "might someday prove to be full species, and maximum sizes might provide evidence as to their status".

Rosenberg identified a minor inconsistency in the grouping of cephalopods (Argonautidae and Nautilidae) and scaphopods (Dentaliidae) with gastropods while listing bivalves separately, opining that "a single alphabetic sequence would be preferable". Rosenberg also found "an unusual number of typographical errors", which he attributed to a rush to have the work ready for the 1997 COA convention. Other issues identified by Rosenberg included the listing of synonyms (e.g. Oliva sericea and its junior synonym Oliva textilina) and different combinations of the same species (e.g. Ancilla lienardi and Eburna lienardi). While suggesting that errors of the second type would be easier to catch if author citations were included, Rosenberg conceded that this might not be practical due to space limitations. Rosenberg also noted entries where the cited location fell well outside the species's natural range (e.g. a supposed West African specimen of the East African Ancilla ventricosa).

Comparing around a quarter of the size records from the first edition against shells in the collections of the Academy of Natural Sciences of Philadelphia, Rosenberg found that the latter had larger specimens in some 10% of cases. What Rosenberg considered "[o]f greatest concern", however, were discrepancies between the record sizes listed in the registry and larger specimens found in contemporary monographic works, and this even extended to type specimens in some cases. The problem seemed to be particularly pronounced in the Pleurotomariidae—a family highly prized by shell collectors—where nine out of sixteen species had larger shells listed in the standard work on the family, that of Anseeuw & Goto (1996). Similar issues were found with the record sizes of Terebridae. Rosenberg concluded: "The Registry would be much more authoritative if it included record sizes from the literature, and I recommend this be done in future editions."

Gene Everson echoed Rosenberg in highlighting the changes from World Size Records as major improvements. In particular he praised the format and exhaustiveness of the publication, writing that, despite having almost double the entries of its predecessor, the registry was much easier to handle compared with the "heavy and bulky" Standard Catalog of Shells. He added that the authors' choice of coil binding made it easier to keep the registry open at the desired page.

Everson questioned some of the publication choices for the reference field, such as the conspicuous omission of "the definitive work on New Zealand shells", New Zealand Mollusca by Arthur William Baden Powell. He continued: "Many other landmark works by highly respected malacologists are omitted, while articles in periodicals frequently written by amateurs, such as La Conchliglia and American Conchologist, are [not]. It would seem the included 49 references were just those used by the authors for this edition." He suggested that future editions should clearly set out what types of references are acceptable. Summarising, Everson wrote:

This book is meant to be a useful, working and evolving tool and should not be nitpicked on details that are not relevant to its purpose. The authors are not producing a treatise on each family with hot-off-the-press reclassifications. I suspect they are following Vaught's classification which has been out for a few years, and is by no means perfect or up-to-date, but is readily available and inexpensive, and thus a good choice. But if so, this standard should be identified in the introduction, so that one knows where to find a shell. Also, typos are found in almost every book, and this is no exception, but they do not lessen the useful information, which is the main reason why we will buy this book. Two thumbs up!

Later editions
A review of the 11th edition criticised the lack of pagination and, consequently, of an index, as well as the lack of page headings indicating families.

Notes

References

External links
 Official website

1997 non-fiction books
Biological records
Conchological literature
Online databases